Tropic All Stars is a football club of Turks and Caicos. They won the inaugural edition of the Turks and Caicos top division, then known as the MFL League, in 1999.

References

Football clubs in the Turks and Caicos Islands